Tom Coyne (1930–
2 April 2015) was a British news broadcaster and television presenter who was known for being one of the earliest presenters of Top Gear.

Early life

He was born in South Shields and attended Corby Hall School in Sunderland, which was a Jesuit run grammar school (now St Aidan's Catholic Academy).
He then worked for A. Reyrolle & Company, an engineering company based in Hebburn that manufactured switchgear for power stations.
He enjoyed acting and was a member of the Westovian Theatre Company.

Career

In his twenties Coyne was a presenter of the BBC radio programme Children's Hour and he made his first television appearance interviewing a miner for Tyne Tees Television and was the first news presenter for the station in 1959.
He was then a presenter for the BBC regional news programme Midlands Today throughout the 1970s and 1980s, making 4,000 appearances and was on the first edition of Nationwide and made many further appearances on the programme which was broadcast nationally.
He also presented Songs of Praise
and in 1980 he returned to Tyne Tees Television to present the nightly news magazine programme Northern Life.
During his career Coyne interviewed many notable people including Catherine Cookson and Muhammad Ali and he was the voice of the geordie gamekeeper, Gordon Armstrong, on the BBC Radio 4 soap opera The Archers for 3 years.

References

External links
 
 BBC News film of Tom Coyne presenting the first edition of Midlands Today broadcast from Pebble Mill Studios, Birmingham

British broadcasters
British television presenters
People from South Shields
1930 births
2015 deaths